Sophronius III (1798 – 3 September 1899) served as Ecumenical Patriarch of Constantinople from 1863 to 1866. He was elected Greek Patriarch of Alexandria on 30 May 1870. He served there as Sophronius IV until his death on September 3, 1899. He established the Holy Church of the Transfiguration of the Saviour in 1888 in the city of Port Said. His Alexandrian patriarchate was marked by unfair expulsion of Nectarios of Aegina, who was later elevated to sainthood.

References

19th-century Ecumenical Patriarchs of Constantinople
Sophronius 04
Greek centenarians
Men centenarians
1798 births
1899 deaths
Greek Orthodox bishops of Chios

Constantinopolitan Greeks
Clergy from Istanbul